Vala (minor planet designation: 131 Vala) is an inner main-belt asteroid. It was discovered by C. H. F. Peters on 24 May 1873, and named after Völva, a prophetess in Norse mythology. One observation of an occultation of a star by Vala is from Italy (26 May 2002). 10-μm radiometric data collected from Kitt Peak in 1975 gave a diameter estimate of 34 km.

In the Tholen classification system, it is categorized as an SU-type asteroid, while the Bus asteroid taxonomy system lists it as a K-type asteroid. Photometric observations of this asteroid during 2007 at the Organ Mesa Observatory in Las Cruces, New Mexico were used to create a "nearly symmetric bimodal" light curve plot. This showed a rotation period of 10.359 ± 0.001 hours and a brightness variation of 0.09 ± 0.02 magnitude during each cycle. The result is double the 5.18-hour period reported in the JPL Small-Body Database.

On 2028-Apr-05, Vala will pass  from asteroid 2 Pallas.

References

Further reading

External links 
 
 

Background asteroids
Vala
Vala
SU-type asteroids (Tholen)
Xc-type asteroids (SMASS)
18730524
Objects observed by stellar occultation